The women's parallel giant slalom competition in snowboarding at the 2022 Winter Olympics was held on 8 February, at the Genting Snow Park in Zhangjiakou. Ester Ledecká of the Czech Republic won the event, defending her 2018 title. Daniela Ulbing of Austria won the silver medal, and Glorija Kotnik of Slovenia the bronze medal. For Ulbing and Kttnik, these were the first Olympic medals.

The 2018 silver medalist, Selina Jörg, did not qualify for the Olympics, but the bronze medalist, Ramona Theresia Hofmeister, did. At the 2021–22 FIS Snowboard World Cup, five parallel giant slalom events were held before the Olympics. Sofia Nadyrshina was leading the ranking, followed by Ulbing and Ladina Jenny. Jörg is the 2021 world champion, with Nadyrshina and Julia Dujmovits being the silver and bronze medalists, respectively.

Qualification

A total of 32 snowboarders qualified to compete at the games. For an athlete to compete they must have a minimum of 100.00 FIS points on the FIS Points List on January 17, 2022 and a top 30 finish in a World Cup event or at the FIS Snowboard World Championships 2021. A country could enter a maximum of four athletes into the event.

Results

Qualification run
The qualification was started at 10:40.

Elimination round

References

Women's snowboarding at the 2022 Winter Olympics